The Merrimack Warriors represent Merrimack College in the Women's Hockey East Association during the 2017–18 NCAA Division I women's ice hockey season.

Standings

Roster

2017–18 Warriors

Schedule

|-
!colspan=12 style=""| Regular Season

References

Merrimack Warriors
Merrimack Warriors women's ice hockey seasons
Merrimack Warriors
Merrimack Warriors